Alioui is a surname. Notable people with the surname include:

Jamal Alioui (born 1982), French-born Moroccan footballer and coach
Nabil Alioui (born 1999), French footballer
Rachid Alioui (born 1992), French-born Moroccan footballer